Phantom 309 is an album by country music singer Woodrow Wilson Sovine, better known as Red Sovine, released by Starday Records in 1967 and re-released by Power Pak Records (the budget division of Gusto Records) in 1975 with the same track listing and album art. There was also a compilation CD of the same name issued by Prism Leisure in 2001. The original album peaked at No. 18 in the US country albums chart and the title track reached No. 9 when originally released and No. 47 on its 1975 release.

Track listing
Side 1
"Phantom 309" (Tommy Faile) 3:30
"Good Enough for Nothing" 2:13
"Three Lovers Were Losers Today" 2:07
"Lifetime to Regret" 2:37
"That’s Me" 2:29
"Anytime" 2:24

Side 2
"In Your Heart" 2:15
"Satisfied" 2:46
"A Good Life" 3:28
"Same Old Situation" 2:38
"Viet Nam Deck of Cards" 3:36
"Bummin’ Around" 2:04

References

1967 albums
Starday Records albums
Red Sovine albums